Norrtälje Municipality (Norrtälje kommun) is a municipality in Stockholm County in east central Sweden. Its seat is located in the city of Norrtälje.

It is the largest and northernmost municipality of Stockholm County and was created in 1971 through the amalgamation of several former municipalities. There are 25 original local government units (as of 1863) combined in the present municipality.

Many of the houses in Norrtälje municipality are summer cottages, only inhabited during summertime. This is due to its geographical location by the Stockholm archipelago, which makes it popular among Stockholmers and tourists.

Localities

Elections

Riksdag

This table lists the national results since the 1972 Swedish municipality reform. The results of the Sweden Democrats from 1988 to 1998 were not published by the SCB at a municipal level due to the party's small size nationally at the time.

Blocs

This lists the relative strength of the socialist and centre-right blocs since 1973, but parties not elected to the Riksdag are inserted as "other", including the Sweden Democrats results from 1988 to 2006, but also the Christian Democrats pre-1991 and the Greens in 1982, 1985 and 1991. The sources are identical to the table above. The coalition or government mandate marked in bold formed the government after the election. New Democracy got elected in 1991 but are still listed as "other" due to the short lifespan of the party. "Elected" is the total number of percentage points from the municipality that went to parties who were elected to the Riksdag.

Transport

Norrtälje is located approximately 75 km northeast of central Stockholm. The European route E18 connects Norrtälje to other parts of Stockholm. Some of the major bus lines to Norrtälje include 620 and 621 from Åkersberga, 639 from Stockholm and Östhammar, 647 from the Stockholm-Arlanda Airport, and 676 from Stockholm.

Demography

Population development

Residents with a foreign background 
On the 31st of December 2017 the number of people with a foreign background (persons born outside of Sweden or with two parents born outside of Sweden) was 9 341, or 15.36% of the population (60 808 on the 31st of December 2017). On the 31st of December 2002 the number of residents with a foreign background was (per the same definition) 5 606, or 10.44% of the population (53 702 on the 31st of December 2002). On 31 December 2017 there were 60 808 residents in Norrtälje, of which 7 559 people (12.43%) were born in a country other than Sweden. Divided by country in the table below - the Nordic countries as well as the 12 most common countries of birth outside of Sweden for Swedish residents have been included, with other countries of birth bundled together by continent by Statistics Sweden.

2022 by district
This is a demographic table based on Norrtälje Municipality's electoral districts in the 2022 Swedish general election sourced from SVT's election platform, in turn taken from SCB official statistics.

Residents include everyone registered as living in the district, regardless of age or citizenship status. Valid voters indicate Swedish citizens above the age of 18 who therefore can vote in general elections. Left vote and right vote indicate the result between the two major blocs in said district in the 2022 general election. Employment indicates the share of people between the ages of 20 and 64 who are working taxpayers. Foreign background denotes residents either born abroad or with two parents born outside of Sweden. Median income is the received monthly income through either employment, capital gains or social grants for the median adult above 20, also including pensioners in Swedish kronor. College graduates indicates any degree accumulated after high school.

There were 51,006 Swedish citizens of voting age. 44.1 % voted for the left coalition and 54.8 % for the right coalition.

International relations

Twin towns — Sister cities
The municipality is twinned with:

 Sicaya Municipality, Bolivia
 Paldiski, Estonia
 Kärdla, Estonia
 Vihti, Finland
 Rūjiena, Latvia
 Pskov, Russia

See also
Roslagen
Penningby castle

References

External links

Norrtälje Municipality - Official site

 
Municipalities of Stockholm County
Stockholm archipelago

nn:Norrtälje